Crotalaria spectabilis, the showy rattlebox or showy rattlepod, is a species of flowering plant in the pea family Fabaceae. It is native to the Indian Subcontinent, southern China, and Southeast Asia. It grows in montane grasslands. It was introduced (originally as a green manure) to most of the world's tropics and subtropics and is now a serious agricultural pest species. It is toxic to livestock, causing liver damage.

References

spectabilis
Flora of the Indian subcontinent
Flora of Indo-China
Flora of South-Central China
Flora of Southeast China
Flora of Taiwan
Plants described in 1821